Alesana is an American post-hardcore band from Raleigh, North Carolina. The group was founded by Shawn Milke, Dennis Lee and Patrick Thompson during the fall of 2004, and is currently signed to Revival Recordings and Artery Recordings. Alesana has collectively released three EPs and five full-length studio albums.

The band started to pick up an audience shortly after the release of the debut, On Frail Wings of Vanity and Wax, featuring a musical style shifting between light and heavy sounds along with a wide influence ranging from pop, punk, metal and even classic rock bands such as the Beatles.  The release of their third album, The Emptiness (2010) saw Alesana's fanbase grow expansively. The band's name comes from Aliceanna Street in Baltimore, the street on which vocalist/rhythm guitarist Shawn Milke and lead guitarist Patrick Thompson grew up.

History

Formation and Try This with Your Eyes Closed (2004–2005)
Shawn Milke and Patrick Thomson were both living in Baltimore, Maryland in the early 2000s where they both played in a few previous bands around that time. One notable band that Milke was in was the punk rock band The Legitimate Excuse, which formed in 2001 in Pennsylvania (and later moved to Baltimore by 2002). About a year into looking for members around the Baltimore area and writing/recording early demos under the de facto/prototype Alesana name, the pair decided it would be best to move to Raleigh, North Carolina and continue their search there due to their fondness of the city's music scene. Once in Raleigh they were eventually joined by Dennis Lee, Steven Tomany, and Daniel Magnuson. With these new members in place, Alesana officially formed in October 2004. The name of the band is inspired from Aliceanna St., which Shawn Milke and Patrick Thompson lived on when playing in Baltimore, MD.  Aliceanna St. is located in Fells Point, a neighborhood in Baltimore.  

Alesana was the first band to join Tragic Hero Records in 2005, and their three demo songs titled "Apology", "Beautiful in Blue"  and "Goodbye, Goodnight for Good" were featured on the compilation All The Tragedy Money Can Buy. In May 2005 they released their debut EP, Try This With Your Eyes Closed. In the same year, founding drummer Daniel Magnuson was replaced by Will Anderson, who was soon replaced by Jeremy Bryan. Alesana then toured across the United States, including an appearance at the Cornerstone Christian music festival, despite their not being a Christian band.

On Frail Wings of Vanity and Wax (2006–2008)
In 2006 they added guitarist/vocalist Adam Ferguson to their lineup. They followed with a full-length album, entitled On Frail Wings of Vanity and Wax, produced by Kit Walters, during the summer of 2006. The album was their first foray into concept albums with most songs being based on Greek mythology. In late 2006 Alesana signed to Fearless Records, which re-released their LP in March 2007 to mostly positive reviews and released a music video for "Ambrosia". In the same year, the song "Apology" in an acoustic version was featured on the compilation release, Punk Goes Acoustic 2. The group played the entire Warped Tour 2007, but afterwards, bassist Steven Tomany left Alesana. The record is also the first to feature Shawn Milke's sister, Melissa Milke, who performs all female vocals.

In early 2008, On Frail Wings of Vanity and Wax charted on the Billboard magazine's Heatseekers chart, peaking at #44.

Where Myth Fades to Legend (2008–2009)
In 2008, Alesana finished recording their second album, Where Myth Fades to Legend. It was released on June 3, 2008, but was leaked on popular torrent sites a month beforehand. Where Myth Fades to Legend was also the title of their headlining tour with Sky Eats Airplane, Our Last Night, Lovehatehero, and The Chariot that supported the album. At the time of preparing for the record a year before, the band lacked an official bass player. Shane Crump, who previously played in a band named Your Name in Vain and originally a merchandise salesman for Alesana, was invited into the group after an audition, thus making the record Crump's debut.

On the 2008 Warped Tour, Shane Crump briefly left due to personal matters at home and Jake Campbell, formerly of Twelve Gauge Valentine, became a temporary fill in-bassist. Upon Crump's return, Adam Ferguson and the band parted ways and Campbell became the new guitarist/vocalist. Shane Crump also took care of all the backing unclean to this point.

On January 20, 2009, the music video for "Seduction", the song features a few screams made by Ferguson before he left the band, because of that Shane Crump lip sync all his screams. On March 10, 2009 the album Punk Goes Pop 2 was released which includes Alesana's cover of "What Goes Around...Comes Around" by Justin Timberlake. Alesana's Where Myth Fades to Legend has also charted on the Billboard 200 at #96 and on the Billboard Hard Rock Album at #13.

The Emptiness (2009–2010)

In late February, Shawn Milke announced Alesana had started writing new material for their upcoming album. They began recording their third studio album, in July 2009, in Portland, Oregon, with producer Kris Crummett. The album, according to Shawn Milke on The Rave TV, would be entitled The Emptiness. The band had made their progress in the studio viewable to fans through a Twitter account and an official website run by the band themselves. Concluding the band's recording session, which began on July 10, Alesana then set out for North Carolina to rest before they began their Vs. tour, which they headlined and included the bands The Bled, Enter Shikari, Broadway, Madina Lake, and Asking Alexandria. On the Vs. tour, Alesana's set included two new songs titled "To Be Scared By An Owl" and "The Thespian". Soon after concluding their month-long Vs. tour, Alesana headlined the "You'd Be Way Cuter in a Coffin" Tour with From First to Last, Asking Alexandria, The Word Alive and Memphis May Fire.

On October 15, Milke and Lee held a second interview with The Rave, where they revealed that they were shooting a music video in the fall for one song from The Emptiness. Milke also revealed that the album, The Emptiness, was to be released on January 26, 2010. On November 23, Alesana released their first recorded work off of The Emptiness, "To Be Scared By An Owl" and began to promote it as a single. The same week, they entered the studio to begin filming their third video which according to their website, is "The Thespian", the song was released on December 8, 2009. In 2009, Alesana won the Best Hardcore/Screamo Band at the Rock on Request Awards. The band were also invited to play "To Be Scared by an Owl" live on The Daily Habit.

After the release of their music video for "The Thespian" the group returned home to NC to prepare for the 2010 Warped Tour.  Right before their first venue on the Warped Tour, guitarist Jake Campbell left the band to be with his family, and Alex Torres of Greeley Estates took his place. Upon the release of The Emptiness, it debuted at #68 on the Billboard 200, which made it the best selling release by the band during this period.

On July 22, 2010, Milke made a statement on the official Revolver website, regarding his constant desire to write scripts, stories and music; considering The Emptiness his 'first printed story'. Milke went on to say that he is constantly writing, and that new material for an Alesana album—as well as material for Wake Me Up, Juliet and Tempting Paris—was already being created. After The Emptinesss recording, the group announced a headlining tour entitled: Two Frail Weeks of Vanity and Wax, in which they performed On Frail Wings of Vanity and Wax in its entirety on each date of the tour, along with confirming that some songs would never be played live again after these concerts. In November 2010, Alesana departed from Fearless and signed to Epitaph Records.

A Place Where the Sun Is Silent (2011)
During the beginning of 2011, the band confirmed that plans for a new record were already in the works. Alesana stated that chosen VIP's were involved within the testing of new tracks that were prepared to be included on their fourth studio album. These trackings were recorded during March 2011 with producer Kris Crummett. By the beginning of that summer, Alesana completely finished the record's recording sessions. Alex Torres, Shane Crump, and Dennis Lee shortly thereafter confirmed that the mixing was finished as well and that they had the first master copies published. The name of the album was then announced to be titled, A Place Where the Sun Is Silent, and was released on October 18.

Before its release, promotion for the record was supported by many magazines, websites and other publications. August 24, 2011 had Alternative Press premiere the first leaked song from the album, entitled "A Gilded Masquerade". September 20 had Buzznet streaming "A Forbidden Dance" on their website as part of a contest for a lyric video.

The album thematizes Dante Alighieri's 14th-century epic poem, Inferno. On December 20, 2011, the song "Circle VII: Sins of the Lion" was voted the best song of 2011 by readers of Revolver.

Side projects, Decade EP, tour and Confessions (2012–2015)

In May 2012, Lee began a four-piece side band named Child of the Jackyl with members of the thrash metal band Vanisher while Milke released "Polaroids In July" with his side project Tempting Paris (consisting of Shawn Milke, Paul Co, Patrick Thompson, Melissa Milke and Joey Mitchell (Swampcandy)). Alesana confirmed later in the year that their fifth studio album is currently in its early stages. Later it was announced the band was parting ways with Alex Torres, shortly after Jake Campbell returned to the band. On May 8 Milke announced that the band had left Epitaph Records and the follow-up to A Place Where the Sun Is Silent will be self-released. The pre production for the new record will start shortly after the You Better Watch Your Mouth, Sunshine! Tour and they plan to release this fall. Shawn Milke will be the producer and Neil Engle, who also worked on The Emptiness and Dance Gavin Dance's Happiness will be involved as engineer.

On March 27, 2014, Alesana released a new song off of their The Decade EP entitled "Double Or Nothing" via the Artery Recordings YouTube channel.

On September 12, 2014, Cliché Magazine interviewed Shawn Milke before their Chaos Is the Ladder Tour with Megosh, The Funeral Portrait and The Things They Carried about their forthcoming album set for a Spring release. The album will be the conclusion of the Annabel trilogy and will be centered around "The Time Quintet" literary book series  by Madeleine L'Engle. The band will also release another single in December.

On February 24, 2015, the band announced via Facebook the third and final part of the Annabel trilogy. The album Confessions was released through Revival Recordings; the first single "Oh, How The Mighty Have Fallen" premiered on March 17. In addition to the announcement of Alesana's new album, the band will be heading out on a nationwide tour with Capture The Crown, The Browning, Conquer Divide, and Revival Recordings labelmates The Funeral Portrait. This 29-day tour will begin in Winston-Salem, NC on April 3 and wrap up on May 3 in Dallas, TX.

On April 2, 2015, the song "Comedy of Errors" premiered on the band's social networks, a videoclip for the song was filmed as lead track of Confessions 

On April 21, 2015, the band's fifth album Confessions was released. It is the conclusion to the Annabel trilogy.

On December 30, 2015, via Revival Recordings YouTube channel, the band released the trailer for the first part of "Comedy of Errors" which premiered on January 7, 2016. On February 7, 2016 the second part was released

Live album problems (2015–2016)
In December 2015, Shawn Milke did an AMA on the Revival Recordings' YouTube channel, a user named Shane Waters asked: "So when's the live album going to be released? Thought it was going to be last year?" and Shawn Milke answered: "So when we opened the session from the Live performance there were a lot of corrupt files.  We've been working to see if the session is salvageable.  Fingers crossed, I appreciate you asking about it!" It leaves unlikely expectations for the release. During this time, most of the vinyls for Confessions and The Emptiness were delayed with logistics problems.

On July 26, 2016, the page www.theannabeltrilogy.com was officially released along with the announcement of a new tour and that the band would be releasing a new novel entitled "Annabel," which is based on the group's three concept albums. The book was released on August 31, 2016 along with a new Deluxe Edition of Confessions with two extra songs, "Fatima Rusalka" and "Ciao Bella" Also, the band embarked on a 10-year tour for their debut album, On Frail Wings of Vanity and Wax, during the fall. This tour was entitled "10 Frail Years of Vanity and Wax", and supporting acts included Oh, Sleeper, Famous Last Words, and Artwork 

On July 27, 2016, the band made official their participation on the second edition of Slipknot's Knotfest in Mexico with bands such; Avenged Sevenfold, Slipknot, Slayer, Animals as Leaders, Enter Shikari, Disturbed, Deftones and many more.

Origins, The Lost Chapters EP and future plans (2017–present)
On April 11, 2017, the band made official their participation on the first edition of the Vans Warped Tour MX with bands including Good Charlotte, Mayday Parade, Suicide Silence, Hatebreed, Never Shout Never and more. The Vans Warped Tour MX would have taken place in the Foro Pegaso in Toluca, Mexico, on May 27, 2017, although this date was pushed back for an intended show on October 22 of the same year before eventually being canceled by the promoters. They eventually did play in Mexico City at the Teatro Ramiro Jiménez on September 16, 2017, along with national groups Allison, Cerberus, Kamikaze Ninja, Say Ocean and Kaizan opening the show.

On October 31, 2017, the band announced a new project titled "Origins". Details of the project were announced in the following days, in which it was revealed that Origins would be a compilation of the band's history all packaged into 1000 limited-edition boxes which would include memorabilia such as a shirt and picks with designs from the earliest days of the band, posters, a new EP entitled The Lost Chapters, a USB drive containing rarities and B-sides, and much more. "Origins" was scheduled for release on Black Friday, 2017. On November 22, 2017, they released the first single off of the upcoming The Lost Chapters EP, entitled "Fits and Starts". The new single was accompanied by a brand new music video, which is mainly a compilation of fan made videos sent to the band.

As of 2022 the band is touring regularly. They have hinted that a new album is in its early stages. It would seem the delay is due at least in part to the members personal. All are married and have children with the exception of Crump and Bryan. Most recently vocalist Dennis Lee and his wife Cayce welcomed a daughter in late 2020. Lee later revealed that she had been born 4 months early and spent 9 months in the hospital. This added to touring and writing delays.

Musical style and influences
Alesana's overall genre has been proven difficult to determine due to their frequent use of light and poppy influence combined with heavy outputs and metal influenced-screaming vocals. According to Corey Apar, Alesana's music combines post-hardcore and heavy metal music with pop-influenced hooks. Alesana has been described as emo, screamo, metalcore, and post-hardcore.  Influences for the band have included The Beatles, Mae, Mew, The Smashing Pumpkins and The Black Dahlia Murder. Alesana's earlier material was also influenced by fellow North Carolinian metalcore bands including Prayer for Cleansing, Between the Buried and Me and Undying.

Members

Current
 Shawn Milke – lead vocals, rhythm guitar, keyboards (2004–present)
 Dennis Lee – screamed vocals (2004–present)
 Patrick Thompson – lead guitar, backing vocals (2004–present)
 Jeremy Bryan – drums (2006–present)
 Shane Crump – bass, backing vocals (2007–present) 
 Jake Campbell – rhythm and lead guitar, backing vocals (2008–2010, 2012–present)

Former
 Daniel Magnuson – drums (2004–2005)
 Steven Tomany – bass (2004–2007)
 Will Anderson – drums (2005–2006)
 Adam Ferguson – guitar, backing vocals (2006–2008)
 Alex Torres – rhythm and lead guitar, backing vocals (2010–2012)

Session musicians
 Melissa Milke – vocals (2006–present)

Timeline

Discography
Studio albums
On Frail Wings of Vanity and Wax (2006)
Where Myth Fades to Legend (2008)
The Emptiness (2010)
A Place Where the Sun Is Silent (2011)
Confessions (2015)

EPs
Try This with Your Eyes Closed (2005)
The Decade EP (2014)
The Lost Chapters EP (2017)

Other songs
"What Goes Around... Comes Around" (Justin Timberlake cover) (2009) – Punk Goes Pop 2
"Fatima Rusalka" (2013) – Non-album song
"Hiatus" (2016) – It's All Acoustic (Revival Recordings' compilation album)

Videography

References

External links 

 

Metalcore musical groups from North Carolina
American post-hardcore musical groups
American emo musical groups
American screamo musical groups
Defiance Records artists
Musical groups from Raleigh, North Carolina
Rock music groups from North Carolina
Heavy metal musical groups from North Carolina
Musical groups established in 2004
Fearless Records artists
Musical quintets
Tragic Hero Records artists